Eurytides orabilis is a species of butterfly in the family Papilionidae. It is native to the Americas.

Description
Both sexes are similar. The fore wing is black with the basal, postbasal, and postmedian areas being a cream-white color. A black stripe crosses through the middle of the cream-white area from the costa. The apical area has two creamy spots. The hind wing is black with cream-white basal, postbasal, and postmedian areas. A small red spot is present on the anal margin. The tails are black with yellowish tips.

Subspecies
 Eurytides orabilis orabilis (Butler, 1872)
 Eurytides orabilis isocharis (Rothschild & Jordan 1906)

Distribution
The nominate subspecies, E. o. orabilis, is found from Panama to Guatemala, and is also found on Costa Rica. E. o. isocharis is found in Colombia and Ecuador.

Behavior
Males often fly above the tree canopy, while females fly along forest edges and streams. Adults use Hernandia didymantha and Cordia megalantha as nectar sources. Freshly emerged males will puddle on wet sand near the edges of streams.

Life cycle
Females lay their white eggs singly on the leaves of Guatteria oliviformis and Guatteria tonduzii. The first instars of the caterpillar are gray-brown, with a saddle on the abdominal segments. The head is black, and the anal plate on the abdomen is yellow-green. The fifth instar is green with black spots on the thoracic segments. The first two and last three abdominal segments are also spotted with black. The osmeterium is yellow.

References

Lewis, H. L., 1974 Butterflies of the World  Page 23, figure 24

Eurytides
Butterflies of Central America
Papilionidae of South America
Lepidoptera of Colombia
Lepidoptera of Ecuador
Fauna of the Amazon
Butterflies described in 1872